Gilles Simon was the defending champion, but lost in the quarterfinals to Paul-Henri Mathieu.

Fourth-seeded Andy Murray won in the final 6–3, 6–4, against unseeded Mario Ančić.

Seeds

Draw

Finals

Top half

Bottom half

External links
 Main draw
 Qualifying draw

Singles